British Divers Marine Life Rescue (BDMLR) is a British charity established in 1988 and is the United Kingdom's leading frontline marine mammal response organisation.  It utilises a network of trained volunteers around the country to respond to marine mammals potentially in need of assistance around the country via a public 24hr hotline and callout system. The organisations main areas of operation are in the United Kingdom and its territorial waters; however, the charity is often requested to provide assistance and training in marine mammal rescue by international governments and charitable organisations due to their vast wealth of knowledge, experience and available equipment including Canada, the Falkland Islands, Kenya, Ireland, Italy, Kazakhstan, Malta and Abu Dhabi amongst others.

BDMLR has developed an internationally renowned Marine Mammal Medic training program and has trained over 20,000 medics worldwide. To complement the Marine Mammal Medic training program, BDMLR has also produced a Marine Mammal Medic Handbook (currently on its 8th edition), that is used globally by various governmental and non-governmental organisations to deal with stranded cetaceans.  The organisation specialises primarily in pinniped (seals) and cetacean (porpoises, dolphins and whales) rescue, however they will also respond to stranded sea turtles, sharks, oiled sea birds and large whales entangled at sea.

In 2008 BDMLR received specialised training from the Provincetown Centre for Coastal Studies (PCCS) in Maine in the United States of America, on how to rescue entangled large free swimming whales, and in 2013 after developing these techniques specifically for British waters formed the BDMLR Large Whale Disentanglement Team (LWDT) made up entirely of trained volunteers ready to respond to entangled cetaceans in British and European waters.

The organization was the subject of widespread global media coverage in January 2006 due to its efforts in leading the response to Willy, a northern bottlenose whale (the "River Thames whale") which became disorientated and later stranded after swimming up the River Thames into central London. A large operation began on the morning of Saturday 21 January and lasted until the evening when the whale died prior to being put to sleep by a specialist marine mammal veterinarian due to its poor health.

In more recent years, amongst the thousands of call out each year attended by BDMLR, the organisation spearheaded the major rescue efforts that were launched to save either mass stranded pilot whales or pilot whales in danger of mass stranding at Loch Carnan in South Uist on the Outer Hebrides of Scotland in 2010, once again at Loch Carnan in South Uist on the Outer Hebrides of Scotland in 2011, at the Kyle of Durness on the North West Corner of the Highlands of Scotland in 2011, at Pittenweem in Fife on the East Coast of Scotland in 2012, at Portmahomack and Dornoch Point on the East Coast of the Highlands of Scotland in 2013 and Staffin Island on the West Coast of Scotland in 2015. In 2018, the BDMLR also took part in monitoring Benny, a beluga whale who had been sighted foraging in the Thames Estuary, and in 2021 successfully managed the infamous Wally the walrus during his time at the Isles of Scilly where he unintentionally damaged unmanned dinghies by attempting to haul out on them.

BDMLR opened its first purpose-built permanent seal hospital in Cornwall in September 2021.  The facility is managed by a vet and supported by a large team of volunteer Medics that can provide intensive care for up to ten seal pups when other local rehabilitation centres were full up.  The centre is able to host volunteers nationwide from within BDMLR for training and can accommodate visitors from other rescue and rehabilitation organisations, with opportunities for classroom learning and hands on experience with guidance from experts in the field.

The charity is also part of a number of coalitions working towards conservation goals around wildlife disturbance, pollution and climate change, including the Seal Alliance, Pinniped Entanglement Group, Dolphinaria-Free Europe, Partnership Against Wildlife Crime, Operation Seabird and more.  It is a founding member of the Marine Animal Rescue Coalition, formed to bring together organisations involved with marine mammal response, rehabilitation and associated issues in the UK to provide a forum for discussion and creating working groups on specific areas like large whale euthanasia and social solitary cetaceans.

Operation Nettie 
In August 2015 BDMLR was contact by the Centre for Coastal Studies in Provincetown, Massachusetts to assist as part of the global response network for large whale disentanglement as member of the Atlantic Large Whale Disentanglement Network (ALWDN) to a Humpback whale in Iceland (nicknamed "Nettie") that was entangled in fisheries debris (at the time suspected, and later confirmed to be monofilament netting panels and lead weighted line from a Gill net array). This was following requests from local whale watching companies and NGOs following failed attempts by local Coast Guard personnel to free the whale. BDMLR, through the International Whaling Commission (IWC), sought permission from the pro-whaling Icelandic government to allow an international rescue team to come to the aid of the whale on welfare grounds. After about a week, permission was granted from the Icelandic government to attempt a rescue of the whale.

The ALWDN decided to form an international response utilising BDMLR manpower and resources backed up by a team member from the International Fund for Animal Welfare (IFAW) in Cape Cod near Boston in the US. The following day, the team consisting of 1 member from IFAW and 3 from BDMLR laden with over 150 kg of rescue equipment met up in the Icelandic capital Reykjavik in preparation for the following days rescue attempt, but due to the complexity of the entanglement, the size of the search area (Faxa Bay) where the whale was last spotted, and the unpredictable weather in the area the team had allowed a minimum of a week to conduct the rescue.

This operation first involved "Nantucket sleigh rides", which proved to be inefficient as a means of facilitating rescue.  The team came up with a new method of attaching a buoy just behind the tail to stop the animal from diving, and bring it to the surface for longer periods, giving the team more opportunities to cut the line when the whale presented its tail. Eventually the team managed to attach the rig to within a metre of the whale's tail and the buoy was quickly pulled into position using a pulley arrangement they had constructed.

The new rig worked and also provided a new separate control line which the team could utilise. The team were now able to pull themselves up to within a metre of the thrashing  tail, and each time the whale's tail would breach the surface, careful cuts would be made using the equipment. Eventually the team managed to cut the lines on both sides of the tail stock, and the trailing line from underneath, and the whale was freed.

External links
BDMLR homepage
BDMLR Facebook fan page
BBC News (21 January 2006) Lost whale dies after rescue bid Retrieved 21 January 2006

Animal charities based in the United Kingdom
Animal welfare organisations based in the United Kingdom
Organizations established in 1988
1988 establishments in the United Kingdom